is a Japanese former swimmer who competed in the 1960 Summer Olympics and in the 1964 Summer Olympics.

References

1939 births
Living people
Japanese male freestyle swimmers
Japanese male butterfly swimmers
Olympic swimmers of Japan
Swimmers at the 1960 Summer Olympics
Swimmers at the 1964 Summer Olympics
Asian Games medalists in swimming
Swimmers at the 1966 Asian Games
Universiade medalists in swimming
Asian Games gold medalists for Japan
Medalists at the 1966 Asian Games
Universiade gold medalists for Japan
Medalists at the 1961 Summer Universiade
Medalists at the 1963 Summer Universiade
20th-century Japanese people